Ibrachy & Dermarkar law firm is a legal practice that serves business legal needs since 1932. The firm acts as legal counsel to several companies operating in Egypt.

Maître Charles Chalom was head of the Egyptian bar association of mixed courts, but he was also a qualified accountant. So, when he set up his legal practice in 1932, the mix of business and law was the seedling of Ibrachy and Dermarkar, the prestigious international law firm as it is known today. In 1952, Messrs. Hassan & Hussein El Ibrachy and Said Dermarkar negotiated a partnership agreement with Mr. Chalom creating Chalom, Ibrachy & Dermarkar.

Dr. Hassan Elibrachy, then the secretary of the royal cabinet, joined the firm in 1953. The firm saw another change in 1956, when Maître, Charles Chalom, resigned from the practice and left Egypt in 1956. That was the birth of the present Ibrachy and Dermarkar law firm; I&D, as it is known.

The history of I&D stands out with achievements; I&D were the main lawyers for the Baron Empain who had established the city of Heliopolis, acted as consultants for Siemens as it modernized the Egyptian telecom system during the Sadat administration era. It consulted for the Japanese group, headed by Toyo Menka Kaisha as it founded the Dekheila Steel Project, the first of its kind in Egypt.

References

External links 
 
 www.taglaw.com
 www.employmentlawalliance.com
 www.legal500.com
 www.IFLR1000.com
 www.managingip.com

1932 establishments in Egypt
Law firms of Egypt
Law firms established in 1932